Mathys is a family surname that could refer to:

Surname
 Charlie Mathys, American professional football player
 Marco Mathys, Swiss footballer
 Lucien Mathys, Belgian racing cyclist
 Maude Mathys, Swiss ski mountaineer
 Melanie Mathys, Swiss female canoeist

Other
 Mathys Bank, Antarctic rock ridge
 Mathys Zyn Loop, South African town

See also
 Mathies
 Mathy
 Matthijs
 Matthys